Greenfield is an unincorporated community in Poinsett County, Arkansas, United States. A railroad town founded along the Missouri Pacific Railroad, it lies five miles north of Harrisburg, and approximately ten miles south of Jonesboro on the new Highway 1.The town lies at the foot of Crowley's Ridge, a lengthy formation that stretches for miles across the state.

At one time, Greenfield had a railway depot, passenger train service, five general mercantile establishments, two churches, a hotel, a saw mill, a cotton gin, flour mill, and numerous personal residences, though today, only the churches and houses remain. During the 19th century, loggers nearly clear cut the region for timber. Today, farms raise soybeans, rice, wheat, milo, cotton, and corn.  

In 2019, The University of Arkansas at Fayetteville purchased a section of land on the west side of Highway 1 and a mile or two north of Greenfield. In 2020, construction began on the future home of the UA Rice Research and Extension Complex.

References

Unincorporated communities in Arkansas
Unincorporated communities in Poinsett County, Arkansas
Jonesboro metropolitan area